Remigiomontanus is an extinct genus of non-mammalian synapsids belonging to the Edaphosauridae. The type species is R. robustus.

References 

Edaphosaurids